Vadym Kolesnik (born October 27, 2001) is a Ukrainian-born ice dancer who competes for the United States. With his skating partner, Emilea Zingas, he is the 2022 CS Golden Spin of Zagreb bronze medalist and 2023 U.S. national pewter medalist.

With his former partner, Avonley Nguyen, he is the 2020 World Junior champion, the 2019–20 Junior Grand Prix Final silver medalist, and the 2020 U.S. junior national champion. He has also won four medals on the ISU Junior Grand Prix series, including three golds, and qualified to the 2018–19 Junior Grand Prix Final.

Personal life 
Kolesnik was born on October 27, 2001, in Kharkiv, Ukraine. He moved to the United States in spring 2017.

Career

Early years 
Kolesnik began learning to skate as a four-year-old after his grandmother took him to a local rink. The coaches at the rink did not wish to take him due to his weight, but he kept returning until one accepted him. In the 2015–2016 season, he appeared internationally with Zlata Iefymenko for Ukraine. Competing in advanced novice ice dancing, they placed ninth at the 2015 Ice Star and then fourth at the 2015 NRW Trophy.

2016–2017 season 
In autumn 2016, Kolesnik and Avonley Nguyen of the United States had a three-week tryout in Novi, Michigan, following which he returned to Ukraine for a few months. They began their partnership in February 2017.

2017–2018 season: Debut of Nguyen/Kolesnik 
Nguyen/Kolesnik received their first ISU Junior Grand Prix (JGP) assignments in the 2017–2018 season. They placed fifth at JGP Belarus and sixth at JGP Italy. After taking gold in junior ice dancing at Midwestern Sectionals, they qualified to the 2018 U.S. Championships, where they would finish fifth.

2018–2019 season: JGP medals 
Nguyen/Kolesnik won the silver medal at 2018 JGP Lithuania, behind Russia's Ushakova/Nekrasov, and the gold at 2018 JGP Slovenia to qualify for their first JGP Final. They placed fifth overall at the 2018–19 Junior Grand Prix Final after placing fifth in the rhythm dance and fifth in the free dance. 

At the 2019 U.S. Championships, they won the silver medal behind Green/Green after placing second in the rhythm dance and winning the free dance. 

At the 2019 World Junior Championships, Nguyen/Kolesnik placed fifth in the rhythm dance but moved up to fourth overall after placing third in the free dance.  They were awarded a small bronze medal for the free, where they had the highest technical base value of any of the competing teams and the second-highest technical score overall.

2019–2020 season: Junior World champion 

Nguyen/Kolesnik began their Junior Grand Prix season at the 2019 JGP United States, where they placed first in both segments with personal best scores and won the gold medal. At 2019 JGP Poland, they again set personal best scores in both segments to take the title and qualify for the 2019–20 ISU Junior Grand Prix Final. Competing at the Final, Nguyen/Kolesnik narrowly lost the gold medal by only 0.16 points behind Kazakova/Reviya of Georgia at the JGP Final.  She commented "we're a little disappointed right now, but we’ll continue to keep on working. All our competitors were really strong. We were only a fourth of a point behind, and we felt we could push and get to the next level, but it didn’t work out."

At the 2020 U.S. Figure Skating Championships, Nguyen/Kolesnik scored 184.38 total points to take the gold medal by more than 22 points. Their free dance, set to Rachmaninoff's "Piano Concerto No. 2," featured all positive grades of execution and eight Level 4 elements, earning 109.89 points.

At the 2020 Bavarian Open, they placed first in both the rhythm dance and free dance to win the gold medal. They concluded the season at the 2020 World Junior Championships in Tallinn, Estonia, where they entered as one of the favorites for the title.  Nguyen/Kolesnik placed third in the rhythm dance behind Shanaeva/Naryzhnyy and Kazakova/Reviya, after Nguyen stepped out of her twizzle sequence.  She remarked they had "left a few points on the table, but now we'll focus on the free dance."  They won the free dance, setting a new junior world record and taking the Junior World title over Kazakova/Reviya.  Nguyen said afterward, "I've dreamed about this moment for so long and to know that our work finally paid off, it just feels great!"  Kolesnik indicated that they had not decided whether to move up to senior competition or remain at the junior level for another season.

At the end of June, Nguyen announced that the two had split. She said she had "many happy memories" of their partnership and wished him the best as they "pursued different paths." Within minutes, Kolesnik's announcement post followed. He thanked Nguyen "for all you have done for our partnership," expressed his admiration for her, and wished her all the best.

2022–2023 season: Debut of Zingas/Kolesnik 
After many months of searching for a new permanent partnership in the midst of the COVID-19 pandemic, Kolesnik tried out with Cypriot-American singles skater Emilea Zingas. Kolesnik would later say that "the first time I skated with Emilea I felt something special. I felt like I can be myself. She opens up in the way that I want to skate and that's how it comes out — freedom." On May 15, 2022, Zingas officially announced that the two would compete together representing the United States.

Zingas/Kolesnik made their international debut at the 2022 CS Golden Spin of Zagreb, where they won the bronze medal.

After winning gold at the U.S. Ice Dance Final to qualify for the 2023 U.S. Championships, the team entered a dance field more open than normal due to presumptive national silver medalists Hawayek/Baker being absent due to health issues. Zingas/Kolesnik unexpectedly placed third in the rhythm dance, less than a point ahead of Zagreb gold medalists Carreira/Ponomarenko, who had erred on their twizzles. After the free dance, Carreira/Ponomarenko had squeaked ahead overall by 0.32, but Zingas/Kolesnik stood on the podium as pewter medalists, a noteworthy achievement in a team's first season. Kolesnik said of the new partnership "I think we've got a match."

Programs

With Zingas

With Nguyen

Records and achievements

Junior world record scores 
Nguyen/Kolesnik are the current junior world record holders for the free dance.

Competitive highlights 
JGP: Junior Grand Prix

For the United States

With Zingas

With Nguyen

With Iefymenko for Ukraine

Detailed results 
Small medals awarded only at ISU Championships. ISU personal bests highlighted in bold.

With Zingas for the United States

With Nguyen for the United States

Junior results

With Iefymenko for Ukraine

Novice results

References

External links 
 
 

! colspan="3" style="border-top: 5px solid #78FF78;" |World Junior Record Holders

2001 births
Ukrainian male ice dancers
American male ice dancers
Living people
Sportspeople from Kharkiv
Ukrainian emigrants to the United States
World Junior Figure Skating Championships medalists